Bakuriani is a daba and a ski resort in the Borjomi district of Georgia. It is located on the northern slope of the Trialeti Range, at an elevation of 1,700 meters (5,576 feet) above sea level.

Geography 
The region around Bakuriani is covered by coniferous forests (mainly made up of spruce). The resort is connected with Borjomi by an electrified narrow-gauge railway. The present-day area of the town was built up by lava flows from the nearby Mukhera volcano.

Winter sports

Ski resort 
The ski area of the resort is split into two separate parts: Didveli and Kokhta/Kokhta-Mitarbi.

The first ski base was opened in 1932. From Bakuriani to Kokhtagori Mountain and Tskhratskaro Pass there are ski lifts, ski tramps. There is artificial snowfall on Didveli skiing routes.

Real Estate Demand 
The demand of real estate in bakurani has grown recently with many hotels and apartments are building the prices are going up too and its forecasted that the price might rise up in the coming years too.

Sports competitions 
In March 2022, Bakuriani was the host city for slopestyle during the 2021–22 FIS Snowboard World Cup, taking place in Georgia for the first time.

Climate 
The climate of Bakuriani is transitional from humid maritime to relatively humid continental. (Köppen: Dfb) The winters are cold and experience significant snowfall while the summers are long and warm. Bakuriani is also home to the Botanical Garden of the Georgian Academy of Sciences.

Infrastructure 
The  Borjomi-Bakuriani railway "Kukushka" uses  track gauge.

A few km south of Bakuriani lies the trajectory of the Baku–Tbilisi–Ceyhan pipeline.

People 

It was the home town of luger Nodar Kumaritashvili, who died during event training on the first day of the 2010 Winter Olympics in Vancouver, British Columbia, Canada. He lived in Bakuriani for much of his life, and the street he lived on was named in his honor after his death. Georgia's flag-bearing athlete at the opening ceremony, alpine skier Iason Abramashvili, also resides there; he thought of withdrawing, but ultimately decided to compete to honor Kumaritashvili's memory.

Gallery

See also 
 List of ski areas and resorts in Asia
 List of ski areas and resorts in Europe
 Samtskhe-Javakheti
 Bakuriani K-115

References

External links 

 www.bakuriani.ge

 Cities and towns in Samtskhe–Javakheti
 Ski areas and resorts in Georgia (country)
 Tourist attractions in the Soviet Union